Kivsharivka is an urban-type settlement in Kupiansk Raion of Kharkiv Oblast in Ukraine. It is located on the left bank of the Oskil, in the drainage basin of the Don. Kivsharivka belongs to Kupiansk urban hromada, one of the hromadas of Ukraine. Population: 

Until 18 July 2020, Kivsharivka belonged to Kupiansk Municipality. The municipality was abolished in July 2020 as part of the administrative reform of Ukraine, which reduced the number of raions of Kharkiv Oblast to seven. The area of Kupiansk Municipality was merged into Kupiansk Raion.

Economy

Transportation
Kivsharivka railway station is on the railway connecting Kupiansk and Sviatohirsk, with further connections to Kharkiv and Sloviansk. There is infrequent passenger traffic.

The settlement has access to Highway H26 connecting Kharkiv with Sievierodonetsk, as well as by local roads to Borova and further to Izium.

References

Urban-type settlements in Kupiansk Raion